41 Corps, 41st Corps, Forty First Corps, XLI Corps , or XXXXI Corps may refer to:

 41st Army Corps (France)
 41st Army Corps (Russian Empire)
 XXXXI Reserve Corps (German Empire)
 XXXXI Panzer Corps

See also
 List of military corps by number
 41st Army (disambiguation)
 41st Battalion (disambiguation)
 41st Brigade (disambiguation)
 41st Division (disambiguation)
 41st Regiment (disambiguation)
 41 Squadron (disambiguation)